Eupatorium altissimum, with the common names tall thoroughwort and tall boneset, is a perennial herbaceous plant in the Asteraceae family with a native range including much of the eastern and central United States and Canada. It is a tall plant found in open woods, prairies, fields, and waste areas, with white flowers that bloom in the late summer and fall.

Description
Eupatorium altissimum is a perennial herb sometimes more than 150 cm (5 feet) tall. 

Leaves and stems are covered with whitish hairs. Leaves are opposite on the stem and either are sessile or have very short petioles. Leaves are lanceolate with 3 prominent veins underneath and teeth appearing only above the middle of the leaves.

E. altissimum produces a large number of small dull white flower heads in a large flat-topped array at the top of the plant. Each head generally has 5 disc florets but no ray florets.

The species is often confused with Brickellia eupatorioides (false boneset) because the flowers look similar and because both grow on limestone soils. However, the leaves of E. altissium are opposite with 3 prominent veins, while the leaves of B. eupatoioides are alternate with 1 prominent vein. Also, E. altissium flower heads consist of 5 florets, while the flower heads of B. eupatorioides have 6 to 15 florets.

Taxonomy
Eupatorium altissimum is part of Eupatorium even when that genus is defined narrowly to include about 40 species of mostly white-flowered plants of North America, Asia, and Europe.

Distribution and habitat
E. altissimum is native to eastern and central North America, from Ontario in the north, Nebraska in the west, Texas and the Florida Panhandle in the south, and Massachusetts in the east. It almost always grows on limestone soils in prairies, open woods, fields, and neglected areas.

Ecology
The plant blooms from August to October. It attracts various pollinators and is a larval host plant for Schinia trifascia (three-lined flower moth.

It can hybridize with Eupatorium serotinum.

References

External links 
 
  
 Photo of herbarium specimen at Missouri Botanical Garden, collected in Missouri in 2014

altissimum
Flora of North America
Plants described in 1753
Taxa named by Carl Linnaeus